Disphragis is a genus of moths of the family Notodontidae erected by Jacob Hübner in 1820. The genus is confined to the New World and it contains about 137 species.

Selected species
Disphragis albovirens Dognin, 1908
Disphragis anatole Miller, 2011
Disphragis bifurcata Sullivan & Pogue, 2014
Disphragis captiosa Draudt, 1932
Disphragis cubana (Grote, 1865)
Disphragis delira (Schaus, 1905)
Disphragis disvirens Miller, 2011
Disphragis hemicera (Schaus, 1910)
Disphragis manethusa (Druce, 1887)
Disphragis notabilis Schaus, 1906
Disphragis rhodoglene Miller, 2011
Disphragis sobolis Miller, 2011
Disphragis splendens Druce, 1911
Disphragis tharis (Stoll, 1780)
Disphragis thrinax Miller, 2011
Disphragis tricolor Druce, 1911
Disphragis vivida Schaus, 1910

Former species
Disphragis normula Dognin, 1909

References

;  2014: The Disphragis notabilis (Schaus) species-group in Costa Rica (Lepidoptera, Notodontidae). ZooKeys, 421: 21-38.

External links

Moth genera
Notodontidae